Sten Lundström (born December 13, 1952 in Malmö) is a Swedish Left Party politician, member of the Riksdag 1998–2006.

References

Members of the Riksdag from the Left Party (Sweden)
Living people
1952 births
Members of the Riksdag 2002–2006
Politicians from Malmö
Members of the Riksdag 1998–2002